The Occupant is a 2020 Spanish thriller drama film directed by David Pastor and Àlex Pastor, and written by David Pastor and Àlex Pastor.

Plot 
The plot revolves around Javier Muñoz (Javier Gutiérrez), a former executive who is forced to sell his apartment because of unemployment. He becomes obsessed with the new occupants, and begins infiltrating their lives.

Cast

Release 
The film was slated for a March 2020 world premiere at the Málaga Spanish Film Festival, but the event was postponed due to the COVID-19 pandemic disruption. It was released on March 25, 2020 on Netflix.

Reception
The website's critics consensus reads, "Meandering character development undercuts The Occupant's exciting premise, though Javier Gutiérrez's exceptional performance makes the proceedings work."

References

External links
 
 

2020 films
2020 thriller drama films
2020s Spanish films
2020s Spanish-language films
Spanish thriller drama films
Spanish-language Netflix original films
Films directed by Àlex and David Pastor
Films scored by Lucas Vidal
Nostromo Pictures films